Niall Griffiths (born 1966) is an English author of novels and short stories, set predominantly in Wales. His works include two novels Grits and Sheepshagger, and his 2003 publication Stump which won the Wales Book of the Year award.

History
Griffiths was born in Toxteth, Liverpool, but had a long family link to Welsh roots in West Wales. As a nine-year-old boy Griffiths found a second-hand copy of a novel by Rhondda writer Ron Berry in a junk shop. Berry, who wrote from the viewpoint of the industrial working class, but in a more earthy and centred style then many of his more celebrated peers, "spoke" to Griffiths who was captured by the language and style of the writing. In future years Griffiths continued to cite Berry as a major influence, along with writers Alexander Trocchi and Hubert Selby Jr. In 1976 his family emigrated to Australia, but returned three years later after his mother became homesick.

Griffiths found himself in trouble with the law during his adolescence, and at the age of 15 he was sent on an Outward Bound course in Snowdonia in North Wales. He found the experience uplifting and refocused him to work harder at gaining an education, eventually gaining a degree in English. Griffith spent several years taking on a number of short term menial jobs before he was accepted into Aberystwyth University to study for a PhD in post-war poetry, but failed to complete the course. He followed this by researching his first novel, following disaffected and marginalised characters, living ordinary lives. This resulted in his debut novel, Grits, a story of addicts and drifters set in rural Wales, which was published in 2000.

Griffiths followed up Grits with Sheepshagger, a novel centred on a feral mountain boy named Ianto, which received strong reviews. In 2002 he published Kelly + Victor, which explores the passionate sexual relationship between two clubbers which spirals towards destruction. The book was made into a film in 2012, directed by his friend Kieran Evans. His 2003 novel Stump won two national awards, the Welsh Books Council Book of the Year and the Arts Council of Wales Book of the Year Award. After two more novels Wreckage and Runt, he wrote two travel guides Real Aberystwyth, about his new home, and Real Liverpool, both edited by Peter Finch.

In 2009 he wrote Ten Pound Pom, travelling back to Australia for the first time as an adult, comparing his memories spent in the country as a child with his new found experiences. He followed this with a book of prose, In The Dreams of Max and Ronnie, New Stories from the Mabinogion, commissioned by Seren Books in a series that reimagines the stories of the Mabinogion undertaken by modern writers. The Dreams of Max and Ronnie take in the story of The Dream of Rhonabwy, while other books in the series featured the authors Owen Sheers, Gwyneth Lewis and Russell Celyn Jones. 2013 saw Griffiths release his seventh novel A Great Big Shining Star, his aggressive take on celebrity culture and fame. Two years later Griffiths released his first collection of poetry, Red Roar: 20 Years of Words.

In 2020 Griffiths won the Wales Book of the Year award for a second time with his novel Broken Ghost

Bibliography

Novels
 Grits (2000 )
 Sheepshagger (2001 )
 Kelly + Victor (2002 )
 Stump (2003 )
 Wreckage (2005 )
 Runt (2007 )
 In The Dreams of Max and Ronnie, New Stories from the Mabinogion (2010)
 A Great Big Shining Star (2013)
 Broken Ghost (2019)

Poetry
 Red Roar:20 Years of Words (2015 )

Non-Fiction
 Ten Pound Pom (2009)

Guide books
 Real Aberystwyth (with Peter Finch) (2008 )
 Real Liverpool (with Peter Finch)

Prizes and awards
2004 – Wales Book of the Year, for Stump
2020 – Wales Book of the Year, for Broken Ghost

Critical studies
 Aleksander Bednarski: Inherent Myth: Wales in Niall Griffiths's Fiction. Lublin: Wydnawnictwo KUL (2012).
 Mark Schmitt: British White Trash: Figurations of Tainted Whiteness in the Novels of Irvine Welsh, Niall Griffiths and John King. Bielefeld: Transcript (2018 )

References

External links
Contemporary writers: Niall Griffiths

1966 births
Living people
People from Toxteth
21st-century English novelists
Welsh novelists
Novelists from Liverpool
Anglo-Welsh novelists
Writers from Liverpool
English male novelists
English male poets
21st-century English male writers